Rodrigo José Galatto or simply Galatto (born April 10, 1983, in Porto Alegre) is a Brazilian retired football goalkeeper who last played for Juventude.

Career

In Brazil
Galatto started his youth career at the Grêmio. He made his first team debut in a Brazilian Série B in a 2-0 away win against Criciúma EC, on May 15, 2005. Galatto became famous the match known as Batalha dos Aflitos. On November 26, 2005, Nautico and Grêmio was on a match that would guarantee one club in the Brazilian Championship. In stoppage time (90+14), the goalkeeper saved a penalty kick and led his team to the First Division. Even with four players sent off, Grêmio also scored a goal with Anderson (90+16).

In 2008 Galatto transferred to Atlético Paranaense. He quickly became part of the main team and for one-a-half season earned 58 appearances playing in the Campeonato Brasileiro Série A. With the club Galatto became a champion of Campeonato Paranaense in 2009 and played at 2009 Copa Sudamericana.

Litex Lovech
On January 22, 2010 Galatto was loaned for one year to Bulgarian side Litex Lovech. He made his debut in the A PFG in a match against Lokomotiv Mezdra, on February 26, 2010.

Málaga CF
On 6 August 2010 he was snapped by Málaga for a fee of €1.2 million. After passing his medical, he signed a three-year contract with the Andalusians. He made his debut on 12 September 2010 in a match against Zaragoza. However, after the departure of Jesualdo Ferreira in November, Galatto found himself seemed into surplus under the new coach Manuel Pellegrini and after the signing of Sergio Asenjo, the Brazilian had to start looking for a new club. On 15 June 2011 he was released from his contract with Málaga.

Honours
Grêmio
Brazilian Série B: 2005
Campeonato Gaúcho: 2006, 2007

Atlético Paranaense
Campeonato Paranaense: 2009

Litex Lovech
Bulgarian A PFG 2009-2010

CRB
Campeonato Alagoano: 2013

After Retirement

Galatto ran for federal deputy in Brazil 2018 election, but was not elected

References

External links
 CBF
 sambafoot
 zerozero.pt
 galatto.com
 globoesporte

1983 births
Living people
Footballers from Porto Alegre
Brazilian footballers
Brazilian expatriate footballers
Grêmio Foot-Ball Porto Alegrense players
Grêmio Esportivo Brasil players
Club Athletico Paranaense players
PFC Litex Lovech players
Málaga CF players
América Futebol Clube (RN) players
Clube de Regatas Brasil players
Criciúma Esporte Clube players
Esporte Clube Juventude players
Campeonato Brasileiro Série A players
Campeonato Brasileiro Série B players
First Professional Football League (Bulgaria) players
La Liga players
Expatriate footballers in Bulgaria
Expatriate footballers in Spain
Association football goalkeepers
Itumbiara Esporte Clube players